Angel Damián López Samaniego (born 13 May 1995) is an Argentine professional footballer who plays as a midfielder for Defensores Unidos.

Career
López Samaniego started his career with Primera B Metropolitana's UAI Urquiza. His professional debut arrived on 21 March 2015 during a 1–2 win against Comunicaciones, appearing for fifty-one minutes prior to being substituted for Isaac Suárez; a further nine appearances arrived in 2015. He scored his first goal in the subsequent 2016 season, netting in an away fixture with Tristán Suárez on 6 May. In 2018, López Samaniego began featuring for Intersoccer Madrid in Spain's Segunda de Aficionados; the seventh tier of the country's league system. He scored two goals in nine fixtures during 2018–19, though departed mid-season.

A return to Argentina with Defensores Unidos was completed in January 2019.

Career statistics
.

References

External links

1995 births
Living people
Place of birth missing (living people)
Argentine footballers
Association football midfielders
Argentine expatriate footballers
Expatriate footballers in Spain
Argentine expatriate sportspeople in Spain
Primera B Metropolitana players
Divisiones Regionales de Fútbol players
UAI Urquiza players
Defensores Unidos footballers